Vishwanath Meghwal is an Indian politician and a former Member of the Rajasthan Legislative Assembly from Khajuwala Bikaner district in Rajasthan. He is a Bharatiya Janata Party politician.

References

Living people
Rajasthani politicians
1966 births